Ibiporã is a municipality in the state of Paraná in the Southern Region of Brazil.

The municipality contains the  Ibiporã State Park, created in 1980.

Toponymy 
"Ibiporã" comes from the Tupi language and means "pretty land", from yby ("land") and porang ("pretty").

See also
List of municipalities in Paraná

References

Municipalities in Paraná